Connections is a 1995 educational adventure video game.

Plot
Based on the show Connections on The Learning Channel, the game revolves around a plot of the player aiming to fix a computer program, by finding a series of connections that glue the world together.

Gameplay
Players progress through a series of graphic screens, and FMV video to find a series of connections. Items can be manipulated using hotspots. The game is narrated by James Burke. Players can toggle a hints system, adjust volume, save the game, and choose their gender.

Critical reception

Lisa Karen Savignano of Allgame wrote that the game was "exceptional" but that it had the potential to leave players endlessly frustrated. GameZone's Craig Majaski thought the game would appeal to players who had enjoyed Myst or Return to Zork. Meanwhile, The AV Club contributor Brian Clair said the game succeeded as a learning tool. MacWorld's George and Ben Beekman thought the game was well below the industry standard for the genre. Entertainment Weekly thought the game was a missed opportunity; instead of being interesting and unique it was merely "Myst with a twist".

The November 1996 edition of Computer Gaming World deemed the video game the #13 Top Sleeper Of All Time.

References

External links
 
 Main page
 Connections at CGW

1995 video games
Educational video games
Classic Mac OS games
Windows games
Video games developed in the United States